The term Red Princess may refer to:

People 
 Archduchess Elisabeth Marie of Austria (1883–1963), Austrian socialist nicknamed "The Red Archduchess"
 Princess María Teresa of Bourbon-Parma (1933–2020), French-Spanish socialist nicknamed "The Red Princess"
 Princess Red Wing (Mary E. Glasko Congdon; 1896–1987), Native American historian

Films 
 Red Princesses, 2013 Costa Rican drama film